As the name suggests, a non-nucleophilic base is a sterically hindered organic base that is a poor nucleophile. Normal bases are also nucleophiles, but often chemists seek the proton-removing ability of a base without any other functions.  Typical non-nucleophilic bases are bulky, such that protons can attach to the basic center but alkylation and complexation is inhibited.

Non-nucleophilic bases
A variety of amines and nitrogen heterocycles are useful bases of moderate strength (pKa of conjugate acid
N,N-Diisopropylethylamine (DIPEA, also called Hünig's Base), p
1,8-Diazabicycloundec-7-ene (DBU) - useful for E2 elimination reactions, pKa = 13.5
1,5-Diazabicyclo(4.3.0)non-5-ene (DBN) - comparable to DBU
2,6-Di-tert-butylpyridine, a weak non-nucleophilic base pKa = 3.58
Phosphazene bases, such as t-Bu-P4

Non-nucleophilic bases of high strength are usually anions.  For these species, the pKas of the conjugate acids are around 35–40.
 Lithium diisopropylamide (LDA), pKa = 36
 Silicon-based amides, such as sodium and potassium bis(trimethylsilyl)amide (NaHMDS and KHMDS, respectively)
 Lithium tetramethylpiperidide (LiTMP or harpoon base)
Other strong non-nucleophilic bases are sodium hydride and potassium hydride.  These compounds are dense, salt-like materials that are insoluble and operate by surface reactions.

Some reagents are of high basicity (pKa of conjugate acid around 17) but of modest but not negligible nucleophilicity.  Examples include sodium tert-butoxide and potassium tert-butoxide.

Example
The following diagram shows how the hindered base, lithium diisopropylamide, is used to deprotonate an ester to give the enolate in the Claisen ester condensation, instead of undergoing a nucleophilic substitution.

This reaction (deprotonation with LDA) is commonly used to generate enolates.

References